Jacaré dos Homens is a municipality in the western of the Brazilian state of Alagoas. Its population is 5,219 (2020) and its area is 142 km².

References

Municipalities in Alagoas